SA20 or SA-20 may be:

 S-300 (missile)#S-300PMU-1/2 (SA-20)
 Autovía SA-20 Motorway in Spain
 SA20 (cricket) - a franchise cricket tournament held in South Africa